The 1948 World Fencing Championships were held in The Hague, Netherlands. The championships were for non-Olympic events only.

Medal table

Medal summary

Women's events

References

1948 in Dutch sport
1948 in fencing
F
Sports competitions in The Hague
World Fencing Championships
20th century in The Hague